Drepanopeziza is a genus of fungi in the family Dermateaceae. The genus contains 14 species.

Species 

 Drepanopeziza campestris
 Drepanopeziza foliicola
 Drepanopeziza fuckelii
 Drepanopeziza paradoxoides
 Drepanopeziza populi-albae
 Drepanopeziza populorum
 Drepanopeziza punctiformis
 Drepanopeziza ribis
 Drepanopeziza salicis
 Drepanopeziza schoenicola
 Drepanopeziza sphaerioides
 Drepanopeziza tremulae
 Drepanopeziza triandrae
 Drepanopeziza variabilis
 Drepanopeziza verrucispora

See also 
 List of Dermateaceae genera

References 

Dermateaceae genera